In Greek mythology, Salagus (Ancient Greek: Σάλαγόν) was the Cretan son of Oenopion, son of Ariadne. His mother was probably the nymph Helice and his sister was Merope (Aero) who was raped by the giant hunter Orion. Together with his brothers Euanthes, Melas, Talus and Athamas, they followed their father when he sailed with a fleet from Crete to Chios.

Note

References 

 Parthenius, Love Romances translated by Sir Stephen Gaselee (1882-1943), S. Loeb Classical Library Volume 69. Cambridge, MA. Harvard University Press. 1916.  Online version at the Topos Text Project.
Parthenius, Erotici Scriptores Graeci, Vol. 1. Rudolf Hercher. in aedibus B. G. Teubneri. Leipzig. 1858. Greek text available at the Perseus Digital Library.
Pausanias, Description of Greece with an English Translation by W.H.S. Jones, Litt.D., and H.A. Ormerod, M.A., in 4 Volumes. Cambridge, MA, Harvard University Press; London, William Heinemann Ltd. 1918. . Online version at the Perseus Digital Library
 Pausanias, Graeciae Descriptio. 3 vols. Leipzig, Teubner. 1903.  Greek text available at the Perseus Digital Library.

Characters in Greek mythology